Docosahexaenoic acid (DHA) is an omega-3 fatty acid that is a primary structural component of the human brain, cerebral cortex, skin, and retina.  In physiological literature, it is given the name 22:6(n-3). It can be synthesized from alpha-linolenic acid or obtained directly from maternal milk (breast milk), fatty fish, fish oil, or algae oil.

DHA's structure is a carboxylic acid (-oic acid) with a 22-carbon chain (docosa- derives from the Ancient Greek for 22)  and six (hexa-) cis double bonds (-en-); with the first double bond located at the third carbon from the omega end. Its trivial name is cervonic acid (from the Latin word cerebrum for "brain"), its systematic name is all-cis-docosa-4,7,10,13,16,19-hexa-enoic acid, and its shorthand name is 22:6(n−3) in the nomenclature of fatty acids.

Most of the docosahexaenoic acid in fish and multi-cellular organisms with access to cold-water oceanic foods originates from photosynthetic and heterotrophic microalgae, and becomes increasingly concentrated in organisms the further they are up the food chain. DHA is also commercially manufactured from microalgae: Crypthecodinium cohnii and another of the genus Schizochytrium.  DHA manufactured using microalgae is vegetarian.

In organisms that do not eat algae containing DHA nor animal products containing DHA, DHA is instead produced internally from α-linolenic acid, a shorter omega-3 fatty acid manufactured by plants (and also occurring in animal products as obtained from plants). Limited amounts of eicosapentaenoic and docosapentaenoic acids are possible products of α-linolenic acid metabolism in young women and men. DHA in breast milk is important for the developing infant. Rates of DHA production in women are 15% higher than in men.

DHA is a major fatty acid in brain phospholipids and the retina. Research into the potential role or benefit of DHA in various pathologies is ongoing, with significant focus on its mechanism in Alzheimer's disease and cardiovascular disease.

Central nervous system constituent
DHA is the most abundant omega-3 fatty acid in the brain and retina. DHA comprises 40% of the polyunsaturated fatty acids (PUFAs) in the brain and 60% of the PUFAs in the retina. Fifty percent of a neuronal plasma membrane is composed of DHA. DHA modulates the carrier-mediated transport of choline, glycine, and taurine, the function of delayed rectifier potassium channels, and the response of rhodopsin contained in the synaptic vesicles.

Phosphatidylserine (PS) – which contains high DHA content – has roles in neuronal signaling and neurotransmitter synthesis, and DHA deficiency is associated with cognitive decline. DHA levels are reduced in the brain tissue of severely depressed people.

Metabolic synthesis
In humans, DHA is either obtained from the diet or may be converted in small amounts from eicosapentaenoic acid (EPA, 20:5, ω-3) via docosapentaenoic acid (DPA, 22:5 ω-3) as an intermediate. This synthesis had been thought to occur through an elongation step followed by the action of Δ4-desaturase. It is now considered more likely that DHA is biosynthesized via a C24 intermediate followed by beta oxidation in peroxisomes. Thus, EPA is twice elongated, yielding 24:5 ω-3, then desaturated to 24:6 ω-3, then shortened to DHA (22:6 ω-3) via beta oxidation. This pathway is known as "Sprecher's shunt".

In organisms such as microalgae, mosses and fungi, biosynthesis of DHA usually occurs as a series of desaturation and elongation reactions, catalyzed by the sequential action of desaturase and elongase enzymes. One known pathway in these organisms involves:
 a desaturation at the sixth carbon of alpha-linolenic acid by a Δ6 desaturase to produce stearidonic acid, 
 elongation of the stearidonic acid by a Δ6 elongase to produce to eicosatetraenoic acid, 
 desaturation at the fifth carbon of  eicosatetraenoic acid by a Δ5 desaturase to produce eicosapentaenoic acid,
 elongation of eicosapentaenoic acid by a Δ5 elongase to produce docosapentaenoic acid, and
 desaturation at the fourth carbon of docosapentaenoic acid by a Δ4 desaturase to produce DHA.

Metabolism
DHA can be metabolized into DHA-derived specialized pro-resolving mediators (SPMs), DHA epoxides, electrophilic oxo-derivatives (EFOX) of DHA, neuroprostanes, ethanolamines, acylglycerols, docosahexaenoyl amides of amino acids or neurotransmitters, and branched DHA esters of hydroxy fatty acids, among others.

The enzyme CYP2C9 metabolizes DHA to epoxydocosapentaenoic acids (EDPs; primarily 19,20-epoxy-eicosapentaenoic acid isomers [i.e. 10,11-EDPs]).

Potential health effects

Cardiovascular
Though mixed and plagued by methodological inconsistencies, there is now convincing evidence from ecological, RCTs, meta-analyses and animal trials show a benefit for omega-3 dietary intake for cardiovascular health. Of the n-3 FAs, DHA has been argued to be the most beneficial due to its preferential uptake in the myocardium, its strongly anti-inflammatory activity and its metabolism toward neuroprotectins and resolvins, the latter of which directly contribute to cardiac function.

Pregnancy and lactation
Foods high in omega-3 fatty acids may be recommended to women who want to become pregnant or when nursing. A working group from the International Society for the Study of Fatty Acids and Lipids recommended 300 mg/day of DHA for pregnant and lactating women, whereas the average consumption was between 45 mg and 115 mg per day of the women in the study, similar to a Canadian study.

Brain and visual functions
A major structural component of the mammalian central nervous system, DHA is the most abundant omega−3 fatty acid in the brain and retina. Brain and retinal function rely on dietary intake of DHA to support a broad range of cell membrane and cell signaling properties, particularly in grey matter and retinal photoreceptor cell outer segments, which are rich in membranes.

A systematic review found that DHA had no significant benefits in improving visual field in individuals with retinitis pigmentosa.

Nutrition

Ordinary types of cooked salmon contain 500–1500 mg DHA and 300–1000 mg EPA per 100 grams. Additional rich seafood sources of DHA include caviar (3400 mg per 100 grams), anchovies (1292 mg per 100 grams), mackerel (1195 mg per 100 grams), and cooked herring (1105 mg per 100 grams). Brains from mammals are also a good direct source. Beef brain, for example, contains approximately 855 mg of DHA per 100 grams in a serving.

Discovery of algae-based DHA
In the early 1980s, NASA sponsored scientific research on a plant-based food source that could generate oxygen and nutrition on long-duration space flights. Certain species of marine algae produced rich nutrients, leading to the development of an algae-based, vegetable-like oil that contains two polyunsaturated fatty acids, DHA and arachidonic acid.

Use as a food additive
DHA is widely used as a food supplement. It was first used primarily in infant formulas. In 2019, the US Food and Drug Administration published qualified health claims for DHA.

Some manufactured DHA is a vegetarian product extracted from algae, and it competes on the market with fish oil that contains DHA and other omega-3s such as EPA. Both fish oil and DHA are odorless and tasteless after processing as a food additive.

Studies of vegetarians and vegans

Vegetarian diets typically contain limited amounts of DHA, and vegan diets typically contain no DHA. In preliminary research, algae-based supplements increased DHA levels. While there is little evidence of adverse health or cognitive effects due to DHA deficiency in adult vegetarians or vegans, breast milk levels remain a concern for supplying adequate DHA to the developing fetus.

DHA and EPA in fish oils
Fish oil is widely sold in capsules containing a mixture of omega-3 fatty acids, including EPA and DHA. Oxidized fish oil in supplement capsules may contain lower levels of EPA and DHA. Light, oxygen exposure, and heat can all contribute to oxidation of fish oil supplements. Buying a quality product that is kept cold in storage and then keeping it in a refrigerator can help minimize oxidation.

Hypothesized role in human evolution
An abundance of DHA in seafood has been suggested as being helpful in the development of a large brain, though other researchers claim a terrestrial diet could also have provided the necessary DHA.

See also
 DHA-clozapine
 List of omega-3 fatty acids
 Polyunsaturated fatty acids

References

Fatty acids
Alkenoic acids
Polyenes